The Diaoyucheng, or Diaoyu Fortress, is a fortress located on the Diaoyu Mountain in Heyang Town, Hechuan District, Chongqing. It is known for its resistance to the Mongol armies in the latter half of the Song dynasty.

History

The death of Mongol leader Möngke Khan during the siege of Diaoyucheng resulted in the immediate withdrawal of Mongol troops from Syria and East Asia.

Although the Mongols and the Southern Song were united in their fight to bring down the Jurchen Jin dynasty, their pact broke immediately afterwards, and the Mongols launched an aggressive war against the tenacious Southern Song that lasted for more than a third of the 13th century. In the period from 1243 to 1279, Diaoyu experienced more than two hundred military confrontations in a miracle of "persistent resistance" that endured for thirty-six years.

Though numbering more than ten thousand and led by the Great Khan Möngke himself, the Mongols were unable to take the tiny fortress. Yu Jian won many brilliant victories, culminating in the deaths of Möngke and his vanguard General Wang Tege.  Sources differ on how Möngke actually died—Chinese sources largely claim that Möngke was mortally wounded by a crossbow arrow (this claim is corroborated by the writings of the Syriac monk Bar Hebraeus) or a stone projectile from a cannon or trebuchet, while Persian sources suggest that Möngke died from infectious diseases like dysentery or cholera (Chinese sources confirm the existence of an outbreak during the siege).

Location

The ancient Diaoyu covers an area of 2.94 square kilometres. Situated on a hill surrounded by water on three sides, it is located about five kilometers east of Hechuan, Chongqing, near the confluence of the Qu, Fu and Jialing rivers. The terrain is precipitous yet beautiful. About 700 years ago, Yu Jian built a fortress here to resist the Mongols during the Southern Song Dynasty (1127–1279).

Sites

As it contains many historical sites—a naval wharf, drilling grounds, watch towers, and a fortification with built-in cannons—Diaoyu has been designated a major national cultural and historic site by China's State Council, and on 28 August 2018 it was placed on the World Cultural Heritage Tentative List.

See also
 Diaoyucheng, a 2012 Chinese opera based on the historic battle
 Siege of Diaoyucheng
 Sichuan anti-Mongol fortresses

References

Major National Historical and Cultural Sites in Chongqing
Geography of Chongqing
Forts in China
Song dynasty architecture
Yuan dynasty
National archaeological parks of China